João Luis Laranjeiro de Abreu (born 31 May 1948) is a Portuguese fencer. He competed in the individual and team épée events at the 1968 Summer Olympics.

References

External links
 

1948 births
Living people
Portuguese male épée fencers
Olympic fencers of Portugal
Fencers at the 1968 Summer Olympics
People from Queluz, Portugal
Sportspeople from Lisbon District